Razmik Andranikovich Tonoyan (born 28 September 1988 in Zaporizhia, Soviet Union) is a Ukrainian sambist who competes in super heavyweight, both in classical and combat sambo. He is multiple medalist of different top-level sambo competitions. At the 2015 European Games he was bronze medalist.
He is of Armenian descent.

References

External links 
 Info at the web site of the Ukrainian Sambo Federation

1988 births
Living people
Sportspeople from Zaporizhzhia
Ukrainian sambo practitioners
Ukrainian people of Armenian descent
Universiade bronze medalists for Ukraine
Universiade medalists in judo
European Games medalists in sambo
European Games bronze medalists for Ukraine
Medalists at the 2011 Summer Universiade